A list of comedy films originally released in the 2020s. Often there may be considerable overlap particularly between comedy and other genres (including, teen, adult, romance, drama, animation, and action); the list should attempt to document films which are more closely related to comedy, even if they bend genres.

2020

2021

2022

2023

2024

2025

2026

2027

References

2020s

Comedy